The surname Rinnan may refer to:
Henry Rinnan, Norwegian Gestapo agent
Arne Rinnan, captain of a Norwegian ship involved in the Tampa affair
Frode Rinnan, Norwegian architect and politician
Ola Mørkved Rinnan, Chairman of Avinor, a major Norwegian aviation company

Norwegian-language surnames